The 1994 Winter Olympic Games cross-country skiing results.

Medal summary

Medal table

Men's events

The winning Italian team was among the last carriers of the Olympic torch in the stadium during the 2006 Winter Olympics opening ceremony in Turin, Italy.

Women's events

Participating NOCs
Thirty-five nations sent ski runners to compete in the events.

See also
Cross-country skiing at the 1994 Winter Paralympics

References

External links
Official Olympic Report

 
1994 Winter Olympics
1994 Winter Olympics events
Olympics
Cross-country skiing competitions in Norway